Arthur Tiller was an American Negro league outfielder between 1909 and 1911.

Tiller made his Negro leagues debut in 1909 with the Indianapolis ABCs. He went on to play for the Kansas City Royal Giants in 1911.

References

External links
Baseball statistics and player information from Baseball-Reference Black Baseball Stats and Seamheads

Year of birth missing
Year of death missing
Place of birth missing
Place of death missing
Indianapolis ABCs players
Baseball outfielders
Kansas City Royal Giants players